Daily Bread Co-operative is an English Christian workers' co-operative specialising in packing and selling wholefoods.  It was the first workers' co-operative to register under what is now known as the "white rules", and is listed as Co-op number 1 under the Industrial Common Ownership Movement (ICOM), which now forms part of Co-operatives UK. One of the founding members, Roger Sawtell, was the first chair of ICOM.

History 
Daily Bread began in the Northampton parish of St. Peter's, Weston Favell when a group of nine friends formed the idea of taking their Christian beliefs and values into the business environment. Since Daily Bread was founded on the basis of Christian beliefs, the name chosen comes from a line in the Lord's Prayer.  

Daily Bread Co-operative (DBC) was registered as a limited company in March 1976, the first business of its kind to adopt a new set of Model Rules for Common Ownership. It was a further four years before trading started, on 1 October 1980, in what was once the laundry of St. Andrew's Hospital, reputedly the largest privately owned psychiatric hospital in the country.

Daily Bread, Cambridge 
Daily Bread has served as a model for other co-operatives and wholefood sellers, including the Unicorn Grocery. Daily Bread in Cambridge opened in 1992 with a staff of five, one ex-member from Northampton and four other full-time members. Its structure is similar to Daily Bread in Northampton, and the Cambridge enterprise was given permission to trade under the original name and to use the co-operative's logo.

References

External links 
 Daily Bread Co-operative

Worker co-operatives of the United Kingdom
Christian organisations based in the United Kingdom
Food cooperatives in the United Kingdom